The Bobs were an a cappella vocal group founded in San Francisco, California in the early 1980s. They moved to Seattle, Washington and were active recording and touring throughout the United States, Canada and Europe until their farewell show at the Barns at Wolf Trap in Vienna, VA, on October 21, 2017.

Background
Founding members Gunnar Madsen and Matthew Stull decided to form an a cappella group when they left their jobs as deliverers of singing telegrams in San Francisco.  Instead of singing more traditional doo-wop songs, The Bobs started out with original arrangements of their own songs and songs like "Helter Skelter" and "Psycho Killer". Although two of their albums are dominated by songs written by others, the overwhelming majority of their repertoire is original, with songs discussing a diverse array of humorous subjects.

Their arrangement of "Helter Skelter" was nominated for a Grammy Award in 1984.

The Bobs have broken with a cappella tradition several times by including instruments.  The majority of the 1995 album Plugged is backed by toy drums. Plugged also made heavy use of studio equipment to make the voices sound more like guitars and bass guitars. Coaster includes a rock rhythm section on one song. Rhapsody in Bob features their arrangement of Gershwin's "Rhapsody in Blue" with pianist Bob Malone playing most of the original piano concerto as The Bobs become a vocal orchestra.  But this original "band without instruments" usually uses just their mouths, hands, feet and "other body parts".

Members of the group are always credited with "Bob" as their middle name. The name is often described as an acronym for "Best of Breed", an award given out at dog shows. Another story that the Bobs give is the name was shortened from "The Oral Bobs" in the first months the group performed together.

The Bobs supplied inter-gender wrestling champion Andy Kaufman with his iconic entrance theme, entitled March & Fanfare. The song was played at the beginning of the Kaufman's biopic, Man on the Moon.

Several anniversary concerts were held in Berkeley, California in January 2006 to celebrate the 25th Anniversary of the Bobs. These concerts featured seven of the eight singers who have ever been in the band.

A documentary about the group, called Sign My Snarling Movie: 25 Years of The Bobs was released in summer 2007.

The Bobs gave their final performance on October 21st, 2017 at The Barns at Wolf Trap in Vienna, VA. It was broadcast live at Acaville.org.

Other appearances

The Bobs performed "Psycho Killer" on the revival of The Smothers Brothers Comedy Hour in 1988.

In the Jason Alexander movie For Better or Worse, the Bobs performed most of the soundtrack, including the background music that occasionally interacted with the story. During the 1995 Emmys they performed a medley of television themes with Alexander.

In 1996, the Bobs performed several original songs and provided the character voices for the online video game Castle Infinity.

The Bobs' recording of the song "Barbara Ann" was used in the 1993 movie Surf Ninjas.

The Bobs' recording of the Jimmy Cliff/Guilly Bright song "Sittin' In Limbo" was featured in the 1991 movie Cool As Ice.

Discography
 The Bobs (1983)	
 My, I'm Large (1987)	
 Songs for Tomorrow Morning (1988)	
 Sing the Songs of... (1991)
 Shut Up and Sing! (1993)
 Cover the Songs of...  (1994)
 Plugged (1995)
 Too Many Santas (1996)	
 i brow club (1997)	
 Coaster (2000)	
 20 Songs From 20 Years: The Best of The Bobs (2003) – includes 12 previously unreleased tracks	
 Rhapsody in Bob (2005)	
 Get Your Monkey off My Dog (2007)
 Biographies (2013)

Compilations
 The Best of the Bobs (1990)
 Songs at Any Speed (2008)

Videography
 The Bobs on PBS's Lonesome Pine Special (1989)
 The Bobs on PBB's Lonesome Pine Special - ISOBOBS (with the dance group ISO) (1990)
 Live at the 20th Century (1998)
 The Bobs Sing! (And other Love Songs) (2000)
 Sign My Snarling Movie: 25 Years of the Bobs (2007)

External links
 MySpace
 Gunnar Madsen
 Quality A Cappella
 radio interview at NPR.org, "The World Cafe"
 The Bobs on Facebook
 Acaville.org
 Matthew Stull

References

The Bobs at [ allmusic.com]

Musical groups from San Francisco
Professional a cappella groups
American new wave musical groups